Albert Van Zetten (born 12 April 1954) is an Australian politician and the current Mayor of Launceston, Tasmania. He was formerly CEO of City Mission Launceston, and worked as an accountant. He lives in Riverside with his wife Lyndle.

He is well known for his opposition to the Bell Bay Pulp Mill, which played a part in his election.

References

External links
Launceston City Council Website
Tasmanian Parliament Website
Albert Van Zetten

Australian people of Dutch descent
Mayors of Launceston, Tasmania
Living people
1954 births
Tasmanian local councillors